Alan Rushton is a New Zealand former rugby league footballer who represented New Zealand in the 1977 World Cup.

Playing career
Originally a second-row, Rushton moved to prop and then to hooker as his career evolved.

Rushton was a Canterbury and South Island representative and was part of the Canterbury side that defeated Auckland 15-14 in 1975. He was first selected for the New Zealand national rugby league team in 1977 for the World Cup. Rushton went on to play 28 matches for New Zealand, including in thirteen test matches between 1977 and 1981.

Rushton captained Canterbury in six matches in 1980. He was a Kiwi from the Eastern Suburbs and Hornby clubs and played for Linwood in 1986.

References

Living people
New Zealand rugby league players
New Zealand national rugby league team players
Canterbury rugby league team players
South Island rugby league team players
Rugby league hookers
Rugby league second-rows
Rugby league props
Hornby Panthers players
Linwood Keas players
Year of birth missing (living people)